The 2016 Team Long Track World Championship was the tenth annual FIM Team Long Track World Championship. The final took place on 16 July 2016 in Mariánské Lázně, Czech Republic.

Results
  Mariánské Lázně
 16 July 2016

See also
 2016 Individual Long Track World Championship
 2016 Speedway World Cup

References

Team Long Track World Championship